Solo in Soho is the debut solo album by Irish rock singer Philip Lynott, released while he was still in Thin Lizzy. Current and former Lizzy members guested on the album, including Scott Gorham, Brian Downey, Snowy White, and Gary Moore. Brian Robertson also contributed to the writing of one of the tracks, "Girls".

Guest musicians
Dire Straits frontman Mark Knopfler plays on the single "King's Call", a lament to Elvis Presley. Huey Lewis plays harmonica on "Tattoo (Giving It All Up for Love)" and "Ode to a Black Man". Lewis later covered "Tattoo" on the 1982 Huey Lewis and the News album Picture This, titled "Giving It All Up for Love".

Yellow Pearl
"Yellow Pearl" was released as a single in two remixed versions; the first of these was later used as the theme tune from 1981 until 1986 for the popular BBC TV music programme Top of the Pops. This version was later included on Lynott's second solo album, The Philip Lynott Album.

Critical reception
Billboard's reviewer left positive review on an album by saying that Lynott's "lyrics have special appeal". He resumed: "There is nothing here even vaguely similar to the dramatic rock energy of "The Boys Are Back in Town" yet this is a bold and interesting batch of tunes aided by uncluttered arrangements and sound playing".

Track listing
All songs by Philip Lynott, except where noted.

Side one
 "Dear Miss Lonely Hearts" (Lynott, Jimmy Bain) – 4:11
 "King's Call" – 3:40
 "A Child's Lullaby" – 2:43
 "Tattoo (Giving It All Up for Love)" – 3:21
 "Solo in Soho" – 4:15

Side two
"Girls" (Lynott, Bain, Brian Robertson) – 4:00
 "Yellow Pearl" (Lynott, Midge Ure) – 4:06
 "Ode to a Black Man" – 4:06
 "Jamaican Rum" – 2:43
 "Talk in 79" – 3:00

Singles
 "Dear Miss Lonely Hearts" / "Solo in Soho" – 7" / 12" (1980)
 "King's Call" / "Ode to a Black Man" – 7" (1980)
 "Yellow Pearl" / "Girls" – 7" / 12" (1981)

Personnel
Philip Lynott – bass guitar, rhythm guitar, keyboards, Minimoog, vocoder, string machine, percussion, vocals, producer
Scott Gorham – guitars (tracks 1, 4, 8)
Snowy White – guitars (tracks 1, 5)
Mark Knopfler – electric guitar (track 2)
Gary Moore – guitar (track 9)
Jerome Rimson – bass guitar (track 5)
Huey Lewis – harmonica (tracks 4, 8)
Fiachra Trench – string and brass arrangements (tracks 3, 4)
Jimmy Bain – piano, Minimoog, string machine (track 6)
Billy Currie – ARP synthesizer (track 7)
Midge Ure – ARP synthesizer, Minimoog, string machine (track 7)
Brian Downey – drums, percussion (track 1, 2, 4, 5, 7, 9)
Bob Benberg – drums, percussion (track 6)
Mark Nauseef - drums, percussion (tracks 8, 10)
Tony Charles – steel drums (track 9)
Andy Duncan – percussion (tracks 3 and 5)
Julia – backing vocals (track 5)
Lena – backing vocals (track 6, 7)
Sophie, Margi, Silver, Christine – backing vocals (track 6)

Production
Kit Woolven – producer, engineer
Tony Visconti, "Flash" Gordon Fordyce, Will Reid-Dick – engineers
Ian Cooper – mastering
Chris O'Donnell – art direction
Linda Sutton, Roger Cooper – artwork and design
John Swannell – photography

Charts

Album

Singles

References

1980 debut albums
Mercury Records albums
Vertigo Records albums
Warner Records albums
Phil Lynott albums